is a former professional Japanese baseball player. He is currently employed as a batting practice pitcher with the Chunichi Dragons.

On 1 October 2016, Nishikawa was released by the Dragons following a lack of development on the farm team.

References

External links
 Dragons.jp
 NPB.jp

1993 births
Living people
Baseball people from Ishikawa Prefecture
Japanese baseball players
Nippon Professional Baseball pitchers
Chunichi Dragons players